NGC 4515 is a lenticular galaxy located about 57 million light-years away in the constellation Coma Berenices. NGC 4515 was discovered by astronomer William Herschel on March 21, 1784. The galaxy is a member of the Virgo Cluster.

See also
 List of NGC objects (4001–5000)
 NGC 4503

References

External links

Coma Berenices
Lenticular galaxies
4515
41652
7701
Astronomical objects discovered in 1784
Virgo Cluster
Discoveries by William Herschel